See also Rhea (disambiguation) or REA

Rea is a comune (municipality) in the Province of Pavia in the Italian region Lombardy, located about 40 km south of Milan and about 7 km south of Pavia. As of 31 December 2004, it had a population of 462 and an area of 3.0 km².

Rea borders the following municipalities: Bressana Bottarone, Cava Manara, Travacò Siccomario, Verrua Po.

Demographic evolution

References

]https://web.archive.org/web/20110725164727/http://www.chrisgibson.org/ancoats/rea_italian_origins/page1.html

Cities and towns in Lombardy